Gnathifera may refer to:
Gnathifera (clade), a superphylum of animals including rotifers and acanthocephalans 
Gnathifera (moth), a genus of moths in the family Epermeniidae